The 11th Politburo of the Lao People's Revolutionary Party, officially the Political Bureau of the 11th Central Committee of the Lao People's Revolutionary Party, was elected at the 1st Plenary Session of the 11th Central Committee in the immediate aftermath of the 11th National Congress in 2021.

Members

References

Specific

Bibliography
Articles and journals:
 

2021 establishments in Laos
11th Politburo of the Lao People's Revolutionary Party